NA-257 Hub-cum-Lasbela-cum-Awaran  is a constituency for the National Assembly of Pakistan. It comprises the districts of Lasbela, Awaran, and Hub from the province of Balochistan. It was created in 2022 out of areas from NA-270 (Panjgur-cum-Washuk-cum-Awaran) and NA-272 (Lasbela-cum-Gwadar).

Assembly Segments

Members of Parliament

2018-2022: NA-272 Lasbela-cum-Gawadar

Election 2018

General elections were held on 25 July 2018.

See also
NA-256 Khuzdar
NA-258 Gwadar-cum-Kech

References 

272